God with us may refer to:

 Immanuel (עִמָּנוּאֵל), the Hebrew name meaning 'God is with us'
 Gott mit uns, the historical motto used by the German military
 Съ нами Богъ! (S nami Bog!), the historical motto of the Russian Empire
 God with Us (Don Moen album), 1993
 God with Us (Laura Story album),  2015
 "God with Us" (song), a 2007 song by MercyMe
 "God with Us", a song by Jeremy Camp from the album Christmas: God with Us, 2012